Gilles Jaquet (born 16 June 1974 in La Chaux-de-Fonds) is a Swiss snowboarder. Jaquet has competed since 1995 and was World Champion in 2001 (Giant Slalom) and 2002. He has also competed at three Olympic Games.

References

External links
 Website of Gilles Jaquet

Swiss male snowboarders
Olympic snowboarders of Switzerland
Snowboarders at the 1998 Winter Olympics
Snowboarders at the 2002 Winter Olympics
Snowboarders at the 2006 Winter Olympics
1974 births
Living people
People from La Chaux-de-Fonds
Sportspeople from the canton of Neuchâtel
21st-century Swiss people